The 2016 Six Nations Championship, known as the 2016 RBS 6 Nations due to the tournament's sponsorship by The Royal Bank of Scotland, was the 17th series of the Six Nations Championship, the annual northern hemisphere rugby union championship.

It was contested by England, France, defending champions Ireland, Italy, Scotland and Wales. Including the competition's previous incarnations as the Home Nations Championship and Five Nations Championship, it was the 122nd edition of the tournament.

England won the Championship on 13 March with a game to play, winning their first Championship since 2011. On 19 March, they earned the Grand Slam for the 13th time, their first since 2003.	
		
The 2016 Championship was the first time in the Six Nations era that both the champions and the wooden spoon "winners" had been decided before the final day, as Italy were confirmed to finish in sixth place for the 11th time on 13 March with Scotland's victory over France. Italy went on to lose their final match, and were thus whitewashed for the seventh time. The 29 tries conceded by Italy was also a Championship record, exceeding the 25 tries they conceded in 2000 and 2003.

Participants

* Except the final match at home against Italy, when Warburton was ruled out due to concussion protocol. Dan Lydiate took his place as captain, with championship vice-captain Alun Wyn Jones also ruled out injured.

Squads

Story of the tournament

Round 1 (6–7 February)
The tournament started with a surprisingly narrow 23–21 win for France over Italy. At one point, Italy had led 18–10 and then 21–20, but a late penalty from Jules Plisson gave France the points. The same day, another tight game saw England retain the Calcutta Cup in a narrow 15–9 win over Scotland, with tries from George Kruis and Jack Nowell. The following day, two of the three tournament favourites, Ireland and Wales, drew 16–16 in Dublin. Ireland had led 13–0 before Wales battled back to lead 16–13. Johnny Sexton's late penalty gave Ireland a share of the spoils.

Round 2 (13–14 February)
Ireland's defence of the title was damaged further in Week 2 when they were beaten 10–9 in a second successive narrow victory for France. Ireland had led 9–3 from before half-time, but Maxime Médard's 69th minute converted try proved to be the winner. Another comeback later that day saw Wales beat Scotland 27–23 in Cardiff. Scotland had led 13–10 at half time, but tries from Jamie Roberts and George North gave Wales a 27–16 lead before a late Scotland score. On Sunday, England easily beat Italy 40–9 after a tight first half, with Jonathan Joseph scoring a hat-trick of tries.

Round 3 (26–27 February)
In the Friday evening kick-off, Wales maintained their title hopes with a 19–10 win over France. Another George North try helped them to a comfortable 19–3 lead before a France try in the last minute. On Saturday, Scotland won their first Six Nations game in 10 attempts, winning 36–20 in Rome with Greig Laidlaw kicking 21 points. Ireland's title hopes were extinguished when they were beaten 21–10 by England at Twickenham; Ireland had led 10–6 early in the second half, but conceded 15 unanswered points in 13 minutes with tries by Anthony Watson and Mike Brown.

Round 4 (12–13 March)
Entering the fourth round of matches, the England-Wales game was touted as a Championship decider, although France – a point behind Wales and two behind England – still had an outside chance of winning it. The first match of the weekend saw Ireland trounce Italy 58–15, running in nine tries. England then beat Wales 25–21 in a thrilling encounter at Twickenham; England had led 25–7 with less than 10 minutes remaining before two converted Wales tries made it a tense ending. England thus won the Triple Crown, and the next day won the Championship outright, as France, needing to win to take the tournament to a final week, lost 29–18 to Scotland in Edinburgh, the Scots' first win over the French in 10 years. In addition to guaranteeing that England would win the tournament, Scotland's victory over France also guaranteed that Italy would finish last and "win" the wooden spoon as a result.

Round 5 (19 March)
All three matches were played on the same day in the last round, with England needing to win in Paris to complete the Grand Slam for the first time since 2003. In the first match, Wales scored nine tries to easily beat Italy 67–14 in Cardiff, effectively whitewashing Italy; they had lost all five of their matches. Ireland then beat Scotland 35–25 in Dublin in an open game where the sides shared seven tries. In the final game in Paris, England scored two early tries through Danny Care and Dan Cole but the excellent kicking of Maxime Machenaud – who scored all of his side's points with seven penalties – kept France in the game until two late Owen Farrell penalties stretched England's lead to 31–21, enough to win the game and the Grand Slam, and to leave Farrell the leading points scorer in the Championship.

Table

Fixtures

Round 1

Notes:
 Sébastien Bezy, Yacouba Camara, Jonathan Danty, Paul Jedrasiak, Jefferson Poirot, Virimi Vakatawa (all France), Mattia Bellini, Ornel Gega, Andrea Lovotti, David Odiete, Dries van Schalkwyk and Matteo Zanusso (all Italy) made their international debuts.
 France retained the Giuseppe Garibaldi Trophy for the third consecutive year.

Notes:
 Zander Fagerson (Scotland) and Jack Clifford (England) made their international debuts.
 England retained the Calcutta Cup.

Notes:
 CJ Stander (Ireland) made his international debut.
 Bradley Davies (Wales) earned his 50th test cap.
 This was the first time that Ireland and Wales had drawn since the 21–21 draw in Cardiff during the 1991 Five Nations Championship.

Round 2

Notes:
 Camille Chat (France) made his international debut.
 This was France's first victory over Ireland since their 26–22 win during the 2011 Rugby World Cup warm-up matches.

Notes:
 Jonathan Davies (Wales) earned his 50th test cap.
 This was Scotland's ninth consecutive loss in the competition, their worst run of losses ever in the six-team format.

Notes:
 Braam Steyn and Edoardo Padovani (both Italy), Paul Hill and Maro Itoje (both England) made their international debuts.

Round 3

Notes:
 Djibril Camara and Vincent Pelo (France) made their international debuts.

Notes:
 Edoardo Gori (Italy) earned his 50th test cap.
 The 36 points scored by Scotland was the most they have scored in any Six Nations game.

Notes:
 Ultan Dillane, Stuart McCloskey and Josh van der Flier (all Ireland), Elliot Daly (England) made their international debuts.
 England regained the Millennium Trophy, having lost it in 2015.

Round 4

Notes:
 Finlay Bealham (Ireland), Oliviero Fabiani, Pietro Ceccarelli and Alberto Lucchese (all Italy) made their international debuts.
 Seán Cronin (Ireland) earned his 50th test cap.
 Sergio Parisse equalled Martin Castrogiovanni's record as Italy's most capped player.
 The nine tries scored by Ireland is the most tries they have scored in a Six Nations match.

Notes:
 England secured their 25th Triple Crown trophy; the previous one was in 2014.

Notes:
 Greig Laidlaw (Scotland) earned his 50th test cap, and equalled David Sole's record of 25 matches as Scottish captain.
 Scotland beat France for the first time since their 20–16 victory at Murrayfield during the 2006 Six Nations Championship.
 This was also Scotland's first win at Murrayfield in the Six Nations since they beat Ireland in round three of the 2013 Championship, breaking a 7-game losing streak at home.
 France's loss guaranteed that England won the championship. This was the first time that a nation has been sure of winning the championship title before their final match during the competition's current six-team format.
 Scotland's win also guaranteed Italy would win the "wooden spoon" for coming last. This was also the first time that a nation has been confirmed as coming bottom of the Championship table before their final match in the competition's current six-team format.

Round 5

Notes:
 Jacopo Sarto (Italy) made his international debut.
 Wales' 53-point margin of victory was their biggest winning margin over Italy, surpassing the previous record of 41 set during the previous 2015 tournament.
 This was Wales' biggest winning margin in a Six Nations match, surpassing the 48-point winning margin set against Scotland in 2014.

Notes:
 Ireland retained the Centenary Quaich for the third consecutive year.
 Rory Sutherland (Scotland) made his international debut.
 Keith Earls (Ireland) and John Barclay (Scotland) earned their 50th test caps.
 Ross Ford (Scotland) made his 100th international appearance; 99 for Scotland, 1 for the British and Irish Lions.

Notes: 
 England secured their first Grand Slam since the 2003 Six Nations Championship
 Owen Farrell became England's second-highest points scorer in history, behind only Jonny Wilkinson and overtaking Paul Grayson.

Statistics

Points scorers

Try scorers

Broadcasting
In the United Kingdom, 2016 marked the first year that the tournament was broadcast across both the BBC and ITV, with the BBC broadcasting France, Scotland and Wales home matches and ITV screening England, Ireland and Italy home fixtures. In this first year of the split UK TV deal, the BBC covered eight matches from the tournament, and ITV the other seven. This arrangement will alternate every year for the remainder of the deal to 2021. S4C in Wales will also broadcast every Wales game in Welsh for the remainder of this contract.

In France, all of the matches were broadcast on France 2, the traditional French channel for rugby. In the Republic of Ireland, matches are being broadcast by RTÉ. In Italy, all of the matches are being broadcast live on DMAX.

References

External links
Official site

 
2016 rugby union tournaments for national teams
2016
2015–16 in European rugby union
2015–16 in Irish rugby union
2015–16 in English rugby union
2015–16 in Welsh rugby union
2015–16 in Scottish rugby union
2015–16 in French rugby union
2015–16 in Italian rugby union
February 2016 sports events in Europe
March 2016 sports events in Europe
Royal Bank of Scotland